The Mitare River is a river in northwestern Venezuela.

The Mitare River flows through the Paraguana xeric scrub ecoregion.
In its delta it divides into the Pedregal and Paraíso rivers, which empty into the gulf of Coro on the Caribbean.
The delta of the Mitare, which is an intermittent stream, was changed in nature when the seaway of the La Vela gulf was closed.
Formerly the delta was highly destructive, but after the closure it became highly constructive.

See also
List of rivers of Venezuela

References

Sources

Rivers of Venezuela